Qasemabad-e Kuchek (also Romanized as Qāsemābād-e Kūchek) is a village in Tankaman Rural District, Tankaman District, Nazarabad County, Alborz Province, Iran. At the 2006 census, its population was 1,275, in 313 families.

References 

Populated places in Nazarabad County